David or Dave Clark may refer to:

Music
Dave Clark (Canadian musician), former member of Rheostatics
Dave Clark (musician) (born 1939), English drummer who formed and led the Dave Clark Five
Dave Clark (promoter) (1909–1995), African-American record promoter and songwriter

Politics
David Clark, Baron Clark of Windermere (born 1939), British politician
Dave Clark (Canadian politician), Progressive Conservative Canadian politician
David C. Clark (1926–2015), American politician from the state of Florida
David Clark (Utah politician) (born 1953), Republican State Representative for Utah's 74th District
David Worth Clark (1902–1955), Democratic U.S. Representative and Senator representing Idaho
David Clark (New Zealand politician) (born 1973), Labour MP for Dunedin North since 2011
David Clark (Georgia politician) (born 1986), Republican State Representative for Georgia's 98th District

Sports
Dave Clark (baseball) (born 1962), baseball player
David Clark (cricketer) (1919–2013), English cricketer
David Clark (footballer, born 1878), Irish footballer
Dave Clark (pole vaulter) (1936–2018), American Olympic athlete
David Clark (racing driver) (born 1978), Australian race car driver
David Clark (rower) (born 1959), Olympic silver medal winner
David Clark (rugby union) (born 1940), former Australian rugby union footballer and current coach
Dave Clark (sprinter), Scottish athlete at the 1990 Commonwealth Games
Dave Clark (television presenter), presenter on Sky Sports
David K. Clark (born 1953), British-born jockey

Others
 Dave Clark, the Midnight comic book superhero
 David Clark (1816 ship), a convict ship
 David Clark, 2008 winner of BBC's Mastermind quiz show
 David Clark (cartoonist), American illustrator
 David Aaron Clark (1960–2009), pornographic actor and director
 David B. Clark, American Latter Day Saint leader
 David D. Clark (born 1944), American Internet pioneer
 David Delano Clark (1924–1997), American physicist
 David L. Clark (1864–1939), Pittsburgh businessman and inventor of the Clark bar
 David Leigh Clark, American paleontologist
 David Clark (psychiatrist) (1920–2010), British psychiatrist who pioneered therapeutic communities in mental hospitals
 David M. Clark (born 1954), British psychologist
 David Worth Clark (1902–1955), educator, media executive and President of Palm Beach Atlantic University

See also 

 David Clark Company, a manufacturer of headphones used in professional applications
 The Dave Clark Five, a musical group
 David Clarke (disambiguation)

Clark, David